The following highways are/were numbered 948:

India
 National Highway 948 (India)

United States